Žigljen is a port in Croatia. It is connected by the D106 highway and by ferry. Regular ferries run to the isle of Pag, in the Adriatic Sea.

References

Pag (island)